is a Japanese actress and former top star of the Takarazuka Revue. She joined the Takarazuka Revue in 1981. Her debut performance was "Takarazuka Haru no Odori" and she became the top star of the Flower Troupe for her role in East Of Eden in 1995. She retired in 1998 after her last show 'Speakeasy', based on the 17 John Gay ballad opera The Beggar's Opera, in which she sang the theme song Kaze no machi no junjō na akutō tachi(風の街の純情な男たち).

Troupe History 
 Flower Troupe: 1981–1998

Career 

She is the first Takarasienne to have a solo photo book shot by Kishin Shinoyama, called "Guy". She is also the only Takarasienne to appear in NHK's Top Runner in December 1997. Furthermore, her concert, "Miki In Budokan", had a sell-out crowd of 30,000 in just 2 days. Her other talents include Japanese dance and baton work.

She entered the Takarazuka musical school at the age of 15 and joined the Takarazuka Revue Company in 1981.

She debuted in the Flower troupe and soon became a rising star among the Revue fans. She and Mira Anju who was a year ahead of her formed the official YANMIKI combination in 1986 Bow Hall performance "Goodbye Peppermint Night." YANMIKI has been one of the most famous otokoyaku (male role) combinations to date. Maya and Anju reunited on stage in 1997 "Goodbye Tokyo Takarazuka", 2004 Takarazuka 90th Anniversary, and 2014 Takarazuka 100th Anniversary.

She became the top star of Flower troupe in 1995 and retired in 1998.

Since her retirement, she has enjoyed popularity as a drama, stage and movie actress and has acted in various dramas including "Himitsu no Hanazono", "Kaze no Haruka" and "Attention Please". She has also shot commercials for Wella, Hagen Daz and Kikkoman, among others.

In 2008, she returned to the stage with Chariteau Versailles to commemorate her 10th year after leaving the Tarazuka stage. In the same year, she married ballet dancer, Nishijima Kazuhiro. The wedding ceremony took place in April 2009 at the famous Meiji Jingu Shrine, where she and her husband were surrounded by the press and their fans.

Commercial actress
Since leaving Takarazuka, Maya has found success appearing in commercials for products such as instant ramen and laxative vegetable juices. In November 2011, Maya was mentioned prominently in media reports surrounding controversy over a brand she promoted, a facial soap called Cha no Shizuku. The soap, produced by Yuuka, since 2009 has produced severe allergic reactions 471 consumers, with 66 of those hospitalized. The media speculated that because Maya had personally recommended the soap, claiming health benefits, she might be one of those potentially held liable for the damages caused to the soap's victims.

Notable Roles and Performances

Takarazuka Era

New Actor Era

If There's Love, I'll Live Forever - Napoleon Bonaparte (lead role)

Regular Cast Era

Berusaiyu no Bara - Girodelle [Star Troupe Special Performance]
Jewel of Romanov - Angelo
Beautiful Beast - Quinby
The Rose of Versailles:Fersen - Oscar and Joseph II
The Prelude to Winter - L'Ubor
Chou-Saishi's Choice - Ryudou
The Emblem of Venetia - Vittorio
Dance Festival - Savinius
Melancholic Gigolo - Stan
Bay City Blues - Leonard
Apple Tree - Adam, Barbara and Ella
Black Jack:A Lucky Bet - Cain [Takarazuka Cast]
Gone with the Wind - Rhett Butler [guest]
Black Jack:A Lucky Bet - Black Jack [Tokyo Cast]
Winter Storm ~Death in St. Petersburg~ - Andre
Kanashimi no Cordova - Romero

Top Star Era

East of Eden - Cal
The Scarlet Pimpernel - Sir Percy Blakeney
Hana wa Hana Nari - Hanawaka
How to Succeed in Business Without Really Trying - J.Pierrepont Finch
Ryoma - Sakamoto Ryoma
Hollywood Babylon - Arthur Cochran
Gone with the Wind - Rhett Butler [National Tour]
That's Revue - Harukaze Taihei
Blue Swan - Alex
Speakeasy - Macheath [Sayonara Show]

Concerts/Dinner Shows
Song and Portrait
Miki in Person
Nice Guy
Miki in Budokan

Performance After Takarazuka

Concert
Adieu Tokyo Takarazuka Theatre
TCA Special OG

TV
 Hi wa Mata Noboru (TV Asahi, 2011)
 Sakura no Oyakodon (Fuji TV, 2017)
 What Will You Do, Ieyasu? (NHK, 2023), Tomoe

"Mioka" - (NTV, 2010)
"Ohitorisama" - (TBS, 2009)
"Buzzer Beat" - (Fuji TV, 2009)
"Sirius no Michi" - (WOWOW, 2008)
"Zettai Kareshi" - (Fuji TV, 2008)
"Attention Please" - SP (Fuji TV, 2008)
"Tokyo Daikushu" - (NTV, 2008)
"Shabake" - (Fuji TV, 2007)
"Galileo" - (Fuji TV, 2007)
"Shinkansen Girl" - (NTV, 2007)
"LIFE" - (Fuji TV, 2007)
"Attention Please SP" - (Fuji TV, 2007)
"Himitsu no Hanazono" - (Fuji TV, 2007)
"Bengoshi Haijima Hideki" - (Fuji TV, 2006)
"Attention Please" - (Fuji TV, 2006)
"Kaze no Haruka" - (NHK, 2005)
"Batsu Kare" - (TBS, 2004)
"Onjuku Kawasemi" - (御宿かわせみ) (NHK, 2004)
"Teruteru Kazoku" - (NHK, 2003)
"Boku dake no Madonna" - (Fuji TV, 2003)
"Dobutsu no Oisha-san" - (TV Asahi, 2003)
"Two Hand Man" - (TV Asahi, 2002)
"Straight News" - (NTV, 2000)
"Ai wo Kudasai" - (Fuji TV, 2000)
"Kizu Darake no Onna" - (Fuji TV, 1999)

Film
Bayside Shakedown 2 (2003) - Superintendent Okita
Take the 'A' Train, Someday (2003) - Anna
Suspect X (2008) - Sakurako Jōnouchi 
Diner (2019)
December (2023)

Japanese dub
Hachi: A Dog's Tale (2009) - Cate Wilson (Joan Allen)

Stage
Big (1999) - Susan
CABARET (2004)
Chariteau Versailles(2008)

References

Living people
Actors from Hiroshima
People from Toyonaka, Osaka
Japanese actresses
Takarazuka Revue
Musicians from Hiroshima
Takarazuka otokoyaku
1964 births